Gulane is a town in the southeastern Middle Shabelle (Shabeellaha Dhexe) region of Somalia.

References
Gulane, Somalia

Populated places in Middle Shabelle